The Boeing Model 6D, a.k.a. Boeing Model 6E, Boeing B-1D and Boeing B-1E, was an American pusher biplane flying-boat built by Boeing between 1928 and 1929.

Development and design

The Model 6D continued the designation series of the 1919 Boeing Model 6 but the only similarity was that they are both biplane pusher flying-boats. The 6D was designed in 1928 and 2 aircraft were built between May 1928 and April 1929. The 6Ds rectangular hull was constructed of wood with wood longerons, covered in spruce veneer. Wings were taken from the Model 40 and shortened, with the pusher engine and wood propeller mounted on the lower side of the upper wing.

A slightly heavier, more robustly built version, powered by a  Pratt & Whitney R-1340 Wasp engine, was produced as the B-1E / Model 204 / Model 204A.

Variants
B-1D2:Two aircraft powered by  Wright J-5 Whirlwind 9-cyl radial engines
B-1EAlmost identical to the B-1D with strengthened structure, the B-1E was powered by a  Pratt & Whitney R-1340 Wasp. Five aircraft were built, of a batch of ten, the remaining aircraft were re-designated Model 204.
Model 204Five B-1E airframes re-designated before completion. Only two were completed by Boeing, one Model 204 and one Model 204A, with a third completed by a private party using the c/n and registration of the original airframe.
Model 204AThe second Model 204 airframe completed as a dual-control trainer for William E. Boeing.

Specifications (B-1D)

References

1920s United States airliners
006D
Single-engined pusher aircraft
Biplanes
Aircraft first flown in 1928